The genus Pulsatilla contains about 40 species of herbaceous perennial plants native to meadows and prairies of North America, Europe, and Asia. Derived from the Hebrew word for Passover, "pasakh", the common name pasque flower refers to the Easter (Passover) flowering period, in the spring. Common names include pasque flower (or pasqueflower), wind flower, prairie crocus, Easter flower, and meadow anemone. Several species are valued ornamentals because of their finely-dissected leaves, solitary bell-shaped flowers, and plumed seed heads. The showy part of the flower consists of sepals, not petals.

Taxonomy
The genus Pulsatilla was first formally named in 1754 by the English botanist Philip Miller. The type species is Pulsatilla vulgaris, the European pasque flower.

It is sometimes considered a subgenus under the genus Anemone or as an informally named "group" within Anemone subg. Anemone sect. Pulsatilloides.

Species

, Kew's Plants of the World Online lists 42 species in the genus Pulsatilla:

Plants of the World Online lists ten named hybrids:
Pulsatilla × bolzanensis Murr
Pulsatilla × celakovskyana Domin
Pulsatilla × emiliana (F.O.Wolf) Beauverd
Pulsatilla × gayeri Simonk.
Pulsatilla × girodii (Rouy) P.Fourn.
Pulsatilla × hackelii Pohl
Pulsatilla × knappii (Palez.) Palez.
Pulsatilla × weberi (Widder) Janch. ex Holub
Pulsatilla × wilczekii (F.O.Wolf ex Hegi) P.Fourn.
Pulsatilla × yanbianensis H.Z.Lv

Cultural significance
Pulsatilla nuttalliana (as the synonym P. patens) is the provincial flower of Manitoba, Canada and (as the synonym P. hirsutissima) the state flower of the US state of South Dakota. Pulsatilla vulgaris is the County flower for both Hertfordshire and Cambridgeshire in England. Pulsatilla vernalis is the county flower of Oppland, Norway. The UK has introduced the UK biodiversity action plan to address the 49% decline in wild Pulsatilla species.

Use and toxicity
Pulsatilla is a toxic plant. Misuse can lead to diarrhea, vomiting and convulsions, hypotension, and coma. It has been used as a medicine by Native Americans for centuries. Blackfoot Indians used it to induce abortions and childbirth. Pulsatilla should not be taken during pregnancy nor during lactation.

Extracts of Pulsatilla have been used to treat reproductive problems such as premenstrual syndrome and epididymitis. Additional applications of plant extracts include uses as a sedative and for treating coughs. It is also used in the field of homeopathy.

References

 Anemone pulsatilla, Wildflowers index, Department of Horticultural Science of NC State University
 Gregory L. Tilford 1997. Edible and Medicinal plants of the West, Mountain Press Publishing  preview
  - "Pasqueflower (Pulsatilla vulgaris) Local species action plan for Cambridgeshire, 1999"

 
Ranunculaceae genera
Medicinal plants
Symbols of South Dakota
Articles containing video clips
Taxa named by Philip Miller